NGC 4296 is a barred lenticular galaxy located about 200 million light-years away in the constellation Virgo. It was discovered by astronomer William Herschel on April 13, 1784. It forms a pair with NGC 4297, and both galaxies are listed as CGCG 042-041, and KPG 331.

It also interacts with NGC 4297.

See also 
 List of NGC objects (4001–5000)

References

External links

4296
1-32-17
07409
39943
Virgo (constellation)
Astronomical objects discovered in 1784
Barred lenticular galaxies
Discoveries by William Herschel
Interacting galaxies